Achim may refer to:

People
 Achim, descendant of David
Achim (name), short form for German given name Joachim and a Romanian surname

Places
Achim, also Achim bei Bremen, a town in the district of Verden, Lower Saxony, Germany
Achim, Wolfenbüttel, village in the district of Wolfenbüttel, Lower Saxony, Germany
Achim District, former kreis (district) of the Prussian Province of Hanover from 1885 to 1932 
Achim-Verden Geest, a nature preserve in Lower Saxony, Germany

See also 

Akim (disambiguation)
Hakim (disambiguation)